The , also known as , is an outdoor sculpture and monument in the city of Medellín, Antioquia, Colombia. It was designed by Colombian sculptor Rodrigo Arenas Betancourt (1919–1995) and it is made of concrete and bronze. It was placed in the main plaza of the La Alpujarra Administrative Center and it was inaugurated on 31 May 1988. The monument features a curved concrete structure with multiple bronze sculptures symbolizing the culture of Antioquia. An urn containing some of Arenas' remains was placed beside the sculpture in 2016.

History and construction
On 4 September 1975, the Government of Medellín approved the construction of a monument that symbolized La Raza. For the monument, Colombian sculptor Rodrigo Arenas Betancourt wanted to represent the culture and people of Antioquia. The base of the monument was built with concrete and plaster.

It was inaugurated on 31 May 1988, being blessed by cardinal bishop Alfonso López Trujillo. During the inauguration, Arenas said:

During the 203-year anniversary commemoration of the Independence of Antioquia in August 2016, Arenas was honored and part of his remains were transferred to an urn next to the monument.

Status
The monument is exposed to multiple contaminants, including pollution, moss, and pigeons and their feces. The damage is visible to the naked eye. In August 2016, then-governor of Antioquia  announced a restoration, but as of April 2018 it had not been conducted.

Description and interpretation
The Museo Universitario de Artes Digitales described the monument as a brown curved sculpture that points to the sky. According to the museum, the monument symbolizes the culture of Antioquia, including its agriculture, religion, and solidarity. The museum interpreted the work as a method to expose Arenas' early life in the Antioquia's farmlands. Andrés Carvajal López from the EAFIT University said it portraits the story of the people that came out of the mud attempting to reach the top, starting from the bottom and trying to reach divinity in the zenith. María Elena Quintero, poet and widow of Arenas, said:

Reception
Sarah Woods described the Monumento a la Raza as a "powerful [and] robust" work that depicts "the forces of good and evil".

Gallery

Notes
A  Original text in Spanish: "".
B  Original text in Spanish: "".

References

External links 

 

1988 establishments in Colombia
Bronze sculptures in Colombia
Buildings and structures in Medellín
Monuments and memorials in Colombia
Tourist attractions in Medellín